Nevada Gulch (elevation ) is a valley in Lawrence County, South Dakota, in the United States. 

Nevada Gulch took its name from the U.S. state of Nevada.

References

Landforms of Lawrence County, South Dakota
Valleys of South Dakota